The St. Joseph kerk is a church dating from the 19th century on the Jansstraat in Haarlem, Netherlands. It is located across from the Janskerk (Haarlem).

History

The Catholic church was built between 1841 and 1843 and was designed by H.H. Dansdorp in a neoclassical style. The organ was built in 1906 by P.J. Adema to replace an organ made in 1855 by H. Lindsen.

References

Churches in Haarlem
History of Haarlem
Rijksmonuments in Haarlem
Roman Catholic churches in the Netherlands